The Kneriidae are a small family of freshwater gonorhynchiform fishes native to Africa.

Some species are sexually dimorphic, with the male possessing a rosette on the gill covers that is absent in the females. Other species are neotenic, retaining larval features into adulthood.

Classification
About 31 species are in five genera:
 Kneriinae
 Cromeria
 Grasseichthys
 Kneria
 Parakneria
 Phractolaeminae
 Phractolaemus

References

 
Taxa named by Albert Günther

Ray-finned fish families

de:Ohrenfische